Esan North-East (Uromi/Uzea) is a town and Local Government Area located in Edo state of Nigeria with an estimated population of 119,346.

Towns and villages 
Uromi, Egbele, Unuwazi, Utako, Onewa, Awo, Uzea, Eror, Idumoza, Arue, Ubierumu-Oke, Ebue, Ewoyi, Odigwele, Eguare, Oyomon, Eko-Ibadin, Efandion, Atani, Ualor-Oke, Amedokhian, Ukoni, Ewoki, and Ebun.

Economic mainstays 
Commerce, cottage industry, agriculture, furniture making, and wood processing.

Tourist centers and attractions 
Onojie palaces.

Natural resources 
Rubber, kaolin, and timber.

Major agricultural products 
Cassava, rice, yams, maize, tomatoes, okra, melon, cocoyam, and rubber.

Health facilities 
General hospital, clinics, and maternity homes.

Educational facilities 
There are 15 secondary schools and 35 private primary schools. Among these schools are the Our Ladies of Lourd, Girls College, and Onewa Technical College.

Geography
Esan North-East is bordered with Atani by Ubiaja, Ebhoiyi by Igueben, Ivue and Obeidu by Irrua, Uzea by Afemai, Amendokhian by Ugboha with towns in all its surroundings.

Government
The North-East Local Government Area is divided into two constituencies. Constituency 1 comprises Wards 1, 2, 3, 4, and 5, while constituency 2 comprises Wards 6, 7, 8, 9, and 10, making a total of 10 political wards represented by two representatives in the Edo State House of Assembly.

Notable people
Esan North-East has produced well-known individuals who are popular in both state and national level. These include:
 Chief Anthony Enahoro - one of Nigeria's foremost anti-colonial and pro-democracy activists
 Archbishop Patrick Ebosele Ekpu
 Cardinal Anthony Olubunmi Okogie
 High Chief, Tony Anenih (Iyasele of Esanland), leader of the ruling PDP.
 Air Vice Marshal Anthony Ebehijele Okpere
 Ehia Olu. Akhabue
 Pastor Raymond Okpere
 Professor Mike Obadan
 Professor E. Okoeguale.
 Architect Mike Onolemhenmhen (former Minister Of Works)
 Flourish Itulua-Abumere
 Dr. Joseph Itotoh (Former Minister for State, Internal Affairs)
 Matthew Okpebholo - businessman
 Dr. Robert S. Okojie (research scientist, NASA)

Religion
The people of Esan North-East include Christians, Migrated Muslims and African traditionalists. Before the Europeans, there existed some of the oldest examples in Africa of African traditional religion.

In 1908, Christianity came to Uromi in Esan North-East through the evangelism of a Roman Catholic priest, Rev. Fr. Joseph Corbeau, a European missionary who was residing then at Ubiaja (seat of Esan-South-East Local Government Area). The people of Uromi, in support of the traditional monarch Ogbidi Okojie, accepted the new religion and after a period of catechetical instruction and evangelism, built a church on land donated by the monarch and his council of Chiefs.

See also 
Esan people
Local Government Areas of Nigeria

References 

Local Government Areas in Edo State